ABS-CBN Film Restoration Project or also known as Sagip Pelikula, was a digital film restoration project of ABS-CBN Corporation in partnership with Central Digital Lab. The project is headed by Leo Katigbak of ABS-CBN Film Archives and Manet Dayrit of Central Digital Lab. The goal of the project is to digitally restore and remaster select Filipino films from the archives of ABS-CBN. Since the beginning of the project in 2011, the project has successfully digitized, restored, and remastered over one hundred Filipino films into a 1080p or 2K Digital Cinema Package format with a maximum resolution of 2048x1080 pixels at 24 frames per second. These films have been released through a wide array of platforms including limited theatrical runs, film festivals, free-to-air and cable television, DVDs, pay per view, and over-the-top content platforms such as iTunes. All of the restoration process are done by Central Digital Lab in the Philippines with the exception of Kakabakaba Ka Ba? and Tatlong Taong Walang Diyos which were commissioned by ABS-CBN to be restored abroad by L’Immagine Ritrovata in Bologna, Italy and was supervised by Davide Pozzi. All copyrights to the films restored and remastered are owned in perpetuity by ABS-CBN Corporation.

On August 31, 2020, the film restoration project unit ceased its operations as part of the retrenchment by the company after its new legislative franchise for the company's broadcasting operations was denied by the House of Representatives.

Restoration process
The first stage of the process is the scanning of the film negatives or prints into a digital picture and sound raw format. Depending on the film's condition, it may undergo a physical cleaning before the scanning could begin. The scanned materials will then undergo an automated and a painstaking frame by frame digital restoration process. The process involves the digital removal of dirt, scratches, fingerprints, discolorations, molds, tape marks, and other damages in the scanned materials. The process also involves the correction of color, brightness, and contrast into its original form often consulting the original cinematographers of each films whenever possible. Subtitles and watermarks, if present, are also removed in the process. The process also involves the restoration and remastering of sound. This involves the syncing of sound to the picture and the removal of unnecessary noises such as eradicate pops and whistles. Extreme measures were also done to remove copyrighted songs from some films. Dozens of technicians, engineers, and artists work hundreds of hours for each film with restoration cost ranging anywhere between twenty-five thousand pesos and ten million pesos per film.

List of notable films restored

References

External links
2013. Classic Filipino films restored by ABS CBN Film Archives: Restoring our Films, Saving our Heritage. IASA
Carmela Barbaza (2014). ABS-CBN Film Archives lists contributions for WDAVH 2014. SEAPAVAA
Tessa Mauricio-Arriola (August 20, 2015). Immortalizing Philippine cinematic classics. The Manila Times
Don Jaucian (Apr 7, 2017). Rescuing the lost heritage of Philippine cinema. CNN Philippines

ABS-CBN Corporation
Film preservation
Digital preservation
2011 establishments in the Philippines
Organizations established in 2011
2020 disestablishments in the Philippines
Organizations disestablished in 2020